The 1950 Tulane Green Wave football team represented Tulane University as a member of the Southeastern Conference (SEC) during the 1950 college football season. Led by fifth-year head coach Henry Frnka, the Green Wave played their home games at Tulane Stadium in New Orleans. Tulane finished the season with an overall record of 6–2–1 and a mark of 3–1–1 in conference play, placing fourth in the SEC.

Schedule

After the season

The 1951 NFL Draft was held on January 18–19, 1951. The following Green Wave players were selected.

References

Tulane
Tulane Green Wave football seasons
Tulane Green Wave football